The Prince Sultan Institute for Environmental, Water and Desert Research is a Saudi Institute was established in 1986 under the name "Center for Desert Studies". It is as an independently administered research organization directly linked to the rector's office of King Saud University. The Institute's purpose is to design and conduct scientific research which is related to desert development and to combating desertification in the Arabian Peninsula.

The Institute is active in the environmental application of remote sensing technologies and maintains its own Remote Sensing Unit equipped with GIS and advanced programs for satellite image processing. In 2007, the Institute published the Space Image Atlas of the Kingdom of Saudi Arabia , which it produced in partnership with the Space Research Institute of King Abdulaziz City for Science & Technology and Geospace Austria.

The Institute is a primary sponsor of the International Conference on Water Resources and Arid Environments which has been held biennially in Riyadh, Saudi Arabia since 2004.

The Institute also serves as headquarters for the General Secretariat of the Prince Sultan Bin Abdulaziz International Prize for Water.

Fields of Research Interest 

Within the context of the arid environments of the Arabian peninsula, the Institute is interested in pursuing research in the following areas:
Desert environment systems
Aridity, and aridity control measures 
Environmental pollution
Environmental awareness and education
Environmental impact of projects
Climate change and early warning of climatic disasters
Maintaining environmental balance
Ecotourism
Land deterioration, desertification, and sand dune stabilization
Natural resources of the desert and their development and protection
Forests and afforestation
Rangeland management and maintenance
Forage crops in both arid and desert environment
Adaptation of imported plants and animals under desert conditions
Identification and evaluation of indigenous plants
Deriving benefit from desert fauna, camels in particular
Genetic modification of indigenous flora and fauna, and protection of native genomes
Preservation of wildlife and biodiversity
Arid land regions
Reclamation and cultivation of desert lands
Traditional agriculture and sustainable development in Saudi Arabia
Care and development of date palms
Water resources, methods of exploring water supplies to avoid scarcity, and the development of relevant technologies.
Irrigation systems
Administration of water resources, particularly rainwater harvesting and storage
Water policy for achieving water security
Water reservation; economical ways of using water for agricultural purposes
Desalination
Economies of utilizing saline water and sea water in agriculture
Utilization of new technologies in research, especially remote sensing and geographic information systems
Solar energy; its utilization in agriculture and desert development
Economic studies relating to patterns of exploitation and agricultural production in the desert.

See also

 List of environmental organizations

Notes

External links 
Prince Sultan Research Center for Environment, Water and Desert - Official website.
Prince Sultan Bin Abdulaziz International Prize for Water – Official website.
King Saud University - Official website.

Environmental organisations based in Saudi Arabia
King Saud University